Moyshe Altman (May 7, 1890, Lipcani, Bessarabia - October 21, 1981, Chernivtsi, USSR) was a Yiddish writer.

Works
 בלענדעניש (Блэндэниш — мираж: две новеллы), Култур: Черновцы, 1926.
 די װינער קאַרעטע (Ди Винэр Каретэ — венская карета, повести и новеллы), Бухарест, 1935.
 אױף די שפּאָרן פֿון מאָטל אומרו: מדרש-פּינחס (Аф Ди Шпорн Фун Мотл Умру: Медрэш-Пинхэс — по следам Мотла-Непоседы: Сказание Пинхоса, согласно листкам Мотла Непоседы, роман), Шолом-Алейхем: Бухарест, 1936.
 שמעטערלינגען (Шмэтэрлинген - мотыльки, роман), Бухарест, 1939.
 דער װאָרצל (Дэр Ворцл - корень: рассказы военных лет), Дэр Эмэс: Москва, 1949.
 געקליבענע װערק (Геклибэнэ Вэрк — избранные произведения), составитель Шлоймэ Бикл, ЦИКО-фарлаг: Нью-Йорк, 1955.
 Корни (рассказы), русский перевод О. Любомирского, Советский писатель: Москва, 1959.
 אױטאָביִאָגראַפֿישע בלעטלעך (Ойтобиографише Блэтлэх — автобиографические листки), Идише Шрифтн: Варшава, 1959.
 Бе-омек hа-рем сипурим ве-романим кецерим (избранные рассказы и романы в переводе на иврит), Тель-Авив, 1967.
 באַם פֿענצטער: זקנישע נאָטיצן (Бам Фэнцтэр: Зкейнише Нотицн — у окна: стариковские заметки), Библиотечка журнала «Советиш Геймланд», №7, Советский писатель: Москва, 1980.
 די װינער קאַרעטע (Ди Винэр Каретэ — венская карета, избранное), предисловие Ихила Шрайбмана, Советский писатель: Москва, 1980.

1890 births
1981 deaths
People from Briceni District
People from Khotinsky Uyezd
Moldovan Jews
Soviet Jews
Soviet writers
Yiddish-language writers